Pyrochroa is a genus of cardinal beetle in the family Pyrochroidae. There are at least two described species in Pyrochroa.

Species
These two species belong to the genus Pyrochroa:
 Pyrochroa grandis
 Pyrochroa serraticornis (Scopoli, 1763)

References

External links

 

Tenebrionoidea
Tenebrionoidea genera